

Events

Pre-1600
70 – The armies of Titus attack the walls of Jerusalem after a six-month siege. Three days later they breach the walls, which enables the army to destroy the Second Temple. 
 927 – King Constantine II of Scotland, King Hywel Dda of Deheubarth, Ealdred of Bamburgh and King Owain of the Cumbrians accepted the overlordship of King Æthelstan of England, leading to seven years of peace in the north.
1191 – Third Crusade: Saladin's garrison surrenders to Philip Augustus, ending the two-year siege of Acre.
1470 – The Ottomans capture Euboea.
1488 – Joseon Dynasty official Choe Bu returned to Korea after months of shipwrecked travel in China.
1493 – Hartmann Schedel's Nuremberg Chronicle, one of the best-documented early printed books, is published.
1527 – Lê Cung Hoàng ceded the throne to Mạc Đăng Dung, ending the Lê dynasty and starting the Mạc dynasty.
1543 – King Henry VIII of England marries his sixth and last wife, Catherine Parr, at Hampton Court Palace.
1562 – Fray Diego de Landa, acting Bishop of Yucatán, burns the sacred idols and books of the Maya.
1576 – Mughal Empire annexes Bengal after defeating the Bengal Sultanate at the Battle of Rajmahal.
1580 – The Ostrog Bible, one of the early printed Bibles in a Slavic language, is published.

1601–1900
1691 – Battle of Aughrim (Julian calendar): The decisive victory of William III of England's forces in Ireland.
1776 – Captain James Cook begins his third voyage.
1789 – In response to the dismissal of the French finance minister Jacques Necker, the radical journalist Camille Desmoulins gives a speech which results in the storming of the Bastille two days later.
1790 – The Civil Constitution of the Clergy is passed in France by the National Constituent Assembly.
1799 – Ranjit Singh conquers Lahore and becomes Maharaja of the Punjab (Sikh Empire).
1801 – British ships inflict heavy damage on Spanish and French ships in the Second Battle of Algeciras.
1806 – At the insistence of Napoleon, Bavaria, Baden, Württemberg and thirteen minor principalities leave the Holy Roman Empire and form the Confederation of the Rhine.
1812 – The American Army of the Northwest briefly occupies the Upper Canadian settlement at what is now at Windsor, Ontario.
1862 – The Medal of Honor is authorized by the United States Congress.

1901–present
1913 – Serbian forces begin their siege of the Bulgarian city of Vidin; the siege is later called off when the war ends.
  1913   – The Second Revolution breaks out against the Beiyang government, as Li Liejun proclaims Jiangxi independent from the Republic of China.
1917 – The Bisbee Deportation occurs as vigilantes kidnap and deport nearly 1,300 striking miners and others from Bisbee, Arizona.
1918 – The Imperial Japanese Navy battleship Kawachi blows up at Shunan, western Honshu, Japan, killing at least 621.
1920 – The Soviet–Lithuanian Peace Treaty is signed, by which Soviet Russia recognizes the independence of Lithuania.
1943 – German and Soviet forces engage in the Battle of Prokhorovka, one of the largest armored engagements of all time.
1948 – Israeli Prime Minister David Ben-Gurion orders the expulsion of Palestinians from the towns of Lod and Ramla.
1960 – Orlyonok, the main Young Pioneer camp of the Russian SFSR, is founded.
1961 – Indian city Pune floods due to failure of the Khadakwasla and Panshet dams, killing at least two thousand people.
  1961   – ČSA Flight 511 crashes at Casablanca–Anfa Airport in Morocco, killing 72.
1962 – The Rolling Stones perform for the first time at London's Marquee Club.
1963 – Pauline Reade, 16, disappears in Gorton, England, the first victim in the Moors murders.
1967 – Riots begin in Newark, New Jersey.
1971 – The Australian Aboriginal Flag is flown for the first time.
1973 – A fire destroys the entire sixth floor of the National Personnel Records Center of the United States.
1975 – São Tomé and Príncipe declare independence from Portugal.
1979 – The island nation of Kiribati becomes independent from the United Kingdom.
1995 – Chinese seismologists successfully predict the 1995 Myanmar–China earthquake, reducing the number of casualties to 11.
1998 – The Ulster Volunteer Force attacked a house in Ballymoney, County Antrim, Northern Ireland with a petrol bomb, killing the Quinn brothers.
2001 – Space Shuttle program: Space Shuttle Atlantis is launched on mission STS-104, carrying the Quest Joint Airlock to the International Space Station.
2006 – The 2006 Lebanon War begins.
2007 – U.S. Army Apache helicopters engage in airstrikes against armed insurgents in Baghdad, Iraq, where civilians are killed; footage from the cockpit is later leaked to the Internet.
2012 – Syrian Civil War: Government forces target the homes of rebels and activists in Tremseh and kill anywhere between 68 and 150 people.
  2012   – A tank truck explosion kills more than 100 people in Okobie, Nigeria.
2013 – Six people are killed and 200 injured in a French passenger train derailment in Brétigny-sur-Orge.

Births

Pre-1600
100 BC – Julius Caesar, Roman politician and general (d. 44 BC)
1394 – Ashikaga Yoshinori, Japanese shōgun (d. 1441)
1468 – Juan del Encina, Spanish poet, playwright, and composer (probable; d. 1530)
1477 – Jacopo Sadoleto, Italian cardinal (d. 1547)
1549 – Edward Manners, 3rd Earl of Rutland (d. 1587)

1601–1900
1628 – Henry Howard, 6th Duke of Norfolk (d. 1684)
1651 – Margaret Theresa of Spain (d. 1673)
1675 – Evaristo Felice Dall'Abaco, Italian violinist and composer (d. 1742)
1712 – Sir Francis Bernard, 1st Baronet, Colonial governor of New Jersey and Massachusetts Bay (d. 1779)
1730 – Josiah Wedgwood, English potter, founded the Wedgwood Company (d. 1795)
1803 – Peter Chanel, French priest and saint (d. 1841)
1807 – Thomas Hawksley, English engineer and academic (d. 1893)
1813 – Claude Bernard, French physiologist and academic (d. 1878)
1817 – Henry David Thoreau, American essayist, poet, and philosopher (d. 1862)
  1817   – Alvin Saunders, Territorial Governor and Senator from Nebraska (d. 1899)
1821 – D. H. Hill, American general and academic (d. 1889)
1824 – Eugène Boudin, French painter (d. 1898)
1828 – Nikolay Chernyshevsky, Russian philosopher and critic (d. 1889)
1849 – William Osler, Canadian physician and author (d. 1919)
1850 – Otto Schoetensack, German anthropologist and academic (d. 1912)
1852 – Hipólito Yrigoyen, Argentinian lawyer and politician, 19th President of Argentina (d. 1933)
1854 – George Eastman, American businessman, founded Eastman Kodak (d. 1933)
1855 – Ned Hanlan, Canadian rower, academic, and businessman (d. 1908)
1857 – George E. Ohr, American potter (d. 1918)
1861 – Anton Arensky, Russian pianist, composer, and educator (d. 1906)
1863 – Albert Calmette, French physician, bacteriologist, and immunologist (d. 1933)
  1863   – Paul Drude, German physicist and academic (d. 1906)
1868 – Stefan George, German poet and translator (d. 1933)
1870 – Louis II, Prince of Monaco (d. 1949)
1872 – Emil Hácha, Czech lawyer and politician, 3rd President of Czechoslovakia (d. 1945)
1876 – Max Jacob, French poet, painter, and critic (d. 1944)
  1876   – Alphaeus Philemon Cole, American artist, engraver and etcher (d. 1988)
1878 – Peeter Põld, Estonian scientist and politician, 1st Estonian Minister of Education (d. 1930)
1879 – Margherita Piazzola Beloch, Italian mathematician (d. 1976)
  1879   – Han Yong-un, Korean poet (d. 1944)
1880 – Tod Browning, American actor, director, and screenwriter (d. 1962)
1881 – Natalia Goncharova, Russian theatrical costume and set designer, painter and illustrator (d. 1962)
1884 – Louis B. Mayer, Russian-born American film producer, co-founded Metro-Goldwyn-Mayer (d. 1957)
  1884   – Amedeo Modigliani, Italian painter and sculptor (d. 1920)
1886 – Jean Hersholt, Danish-American actor and director (d. 1956)
1888 – Zygmunt Janiszewski, Polish mathematician and academic (d. 1920)
1892 – Bruno Schulz, Ukrainian-Polish author and painter (d. 1942)
1895 – Kirsten Flagstad, Norwegian soprano (d. 1962)
  1895   – Buckminster Fuller, American architect and engineer, designed the Montreal Biosphère (d. 1983)
  1895   – Oscar Hammerstein II, American director, producer, and songwriter (d. 1960)
1899 – E.D. Nixon, American civil rights leader (d. 1987)

1901–present
1902 – Günther Anders, German philosopher and journalist (d. 1992)
  1902   – Tony Lovink, Dutch politician; Governor-General of the Dutch East Indies (d. 1995)
  1902   – Vic Armbruster, Australian rugby league player (d. 1984)
1904 – Pablo Neruda, Chilean poet and diplomat, Nobel Prize laureate (d. 1973)
1907 – Weary Dunlop,  Australian colonel and surgeon (d. 1993)
1908 – Milton Berle, American comedian and actor (d. 2002)
  1908   – Alain Cuny, French actor (d. 1994)
  1908   – Paul Runyan, American golfer and sportscaster (d. 2002)
1909 – Joe DeRita, American actor (d. 1993)
  1909   – Motoichi Kumagai, Japanese photographer and illustrator (d. 2010)
  1909   – Fritz Leonhardt, German engineer, designed Fernsehturm Stuttgart (d. 1999)
  1909   – Herbert Zim, American naturalist, author, and educator (d. 1994)
1911 – Evald Mikson, Estonian footballer (d. 1993)
1913 – Willis Lamb, American physicist and academic, Nobel Prize laureate (d. 2008)
1914 – Mohammad Moin, Iranian linguist and lexicographer (d. 1971)
1915 – Emanuel Papper, American anesthesiologist, professor, and author (d. 2002)
  1915   – Princess Catherine Ivanovna of Russia, (d. 2007)
1916 – Lyudmila Pavlichenko, Ukrainian-Russian soldier and sniper (d. 1974)
1917 – Luigi Gorrini, Italian soldier and pilot (d. 2014)
  1917   – Satyendra Narayan Sinha, Indian statesman (d. 2006)
  1917   – Andrew Wyeth, American artist (d. 2009)
1918 – Mary Glen-Haig, English fencer (d. 2014)
  1918   – Vivian Mason, American actress (d. 2009)
  1918   – Doris Grumbach, American novelist, memoirist, biographer, literary critic, and essayist (d. 2022)
  1918   – Rusty Dedrick, American swing and bebop jazz trumpeter (d. 2009)
1920 – Pierre Berton, Canadian journalist and author (d. 2004)
  1920   – Bob Fillion, Canadian ice hockey player and manager (d. 2015)
  1920   – Paul Gonsalves, American saxophonist (d. 1974)
  1920   – Randolph Quirk, Manx linguist and academic (d. 2017)
  1920   – Beah Richards, American actress (d. 2000)
1922 – Mark Hatfield, American soldier and politician, 29th Governor of Oregon (d. 2011)
1923 – James E. Gunn, American science fiction author (d. 2020)
1924 – Faidon Matthaiou, Greek basketball player and coach (d. 2011)
1925 – Albert Lance, Australian-French tenor (d. 2013)
  1925   – Roger Smith, American businessman (d. 2007)
1926 – Siti Hasmah Mohamad Ali, wife of the Prime Minister of Malaysia, Tun Dr. Mahathir Mohamad
1927 – Françoys Bernier, Canadian pianist, conductor, and educator (d. 1993) 
  1927   – Conte Candoli, American trumpet player (d. 2001)
  1927   – Jack Harshman, American baseball player (d. 2013)
  1927   – Harley Hotchkiss, Canadian businessman (d. 2011)
1928 – Alastair Burnet, English journalist (d. 2012)
  1928   – Elias James Corey, American chemist and academic, Nobel Prize laureate
  1928   – Imero Fiorentino, American lighting designer (d. 2013)
1930 – Gordon Pinsent, Canadian actor, director, and screenwriter (d. 2023)
 1930 –Guy Ligier,  French racing driver and team owner (d. 2015)
1931 – Eric Ives, English historian and academic (d. 2012)
  1931   – Geeto Mongol, Canadian-American wrestler and trainer (d. 2013)
1932 – Rene Goulet, Canadian professional wrestler (d. 2019)
  1932   – Monte Hellman, American director and producer (d. 2021)
  1932   – Otis Davis, American sprinter
1933 – Victor Poor, American engineer, developed the Datapoint 2200 (d. 2012)
  1933   – Donald E. Westlake, American author and screenwriter (d. 2008)
1934 – Thomas Charlton, American competition rower and Olympic champion
  1934   – Van Cliburn, American pianist and composer (d. 2013)
1935 – Satoshi Ōmura, Japanese biochemist and academic, Nobel Prize laureate
1936 – Jan Němec, Czech director and screenwriter (d. 2016)
1937 – Bill Cosby, American actor, comedian, producer, and screenwriter
  1937   – Mickey Edwards, American lawyer and politician
  1937   – Lionel Jospin, French civil servant and politician, 165th Prime Minister of France
  1937   – Robert McFarlane, American colonel and diplomat, 13th United States National Security Advisor (d. 2022)
  1937   – Guy Woolfenden, English composer and conductor (d. 2016)
1938 – Ron Fairly, American baseball player and sportscaster (d. 2019)
  1938   – Wieger Mensonides, Dutch swimmer
  1938   – Eiko Ishioka, Japanese art director and graphic designer (d. 2012)
1939 – Phillip Adams, Australian journalist and producer
  1939   – Arlen Ness, American motorcycle designer and entrepreneur (d. 2019)
1941 – Benny Parsons, American race car driver and sportscaster (d. 2007)
1942 – Swamp Dogg, American R&B singer-songwriter and musician
  1942   – Roy Palmer, English cricketer and umpire
  1942   – Billy Smith, Australian rugby league player and coach
  1942   – Steve Young, American country singer-songwriter and guitarist (d. 2016)
1943 – Christine McVie, English singer-songwriter and keyboard player (d. 2022) 
  1943   – Paul Silas, American basketball player and coach (d. 2022) 
1944 – Simon Blackburn, English philosopher and academic 
  1944   – Delia Ephron, American author, playwright, and screenwriter
  1944   – Pat Woodell, American actress and singer (d. 2015)
1945 – Butch Hancock, American country-folk singer-songwriter and musician
1947 – Gareth Edwards, Welsh rugby player and sportscaster
  1947   – Wilko Johnson, English singer-songwriter, guitarist, and actor (d. 2022)
  1947   – Richard C. McCarty, American psychologist and academic
1948 – Ben Burtt, American director, screenwriter, and sound designer
  1948   – Walter Egan, American singer-songwriter and guitarist
  1948   – Richard Simmons, American fitness trainer and actor
1949 – Simon Fox, English drummer 
  1949   – Rick Hendrick, American businessman, founded Hendrick Motorsports
1950 – Eric Carr, American drummer and songwriter (d. 1991)
  1950   – Gilles Meloche, Canadian ice hockey player and coach
1951 – Joan Bauer, American author
  1951   – Brian Grazer, American screenwriter and producer, founded Imagine Entertainment
  1951   – Cheryl Ladd, American actress
  1951   – Piotr Pustelnik, Polish mountaineer
  1951   – Jamey Sheridan, American actor 
1952 – Voja Antonić, Serbian computer scientist and journalist, designed the Galaksija computer
  1952   – Irina Bokova, Bulgarian politician, Bulgarian Minister of Foreign Affairs
  1952   – Philip Taylor Kramer, American bass player (d. 1995)
1954 – Eric Adams, American singer-songwriter 
  1954   – Robert Carl, American pianist and composer
  1954   – Wolfgang Dremmler, German footballer and coach
1955 – Timothy Garton Ash, English historian and author
  1955   – Jimmy LaFave, American singer-songwriter and guitarist (d. 2017)
1956 – Mel Harris, American actress
  1956   – Sandi Patty, American singer and pianist
  1956   – Mario Soto, Dominican baseball player
1957 – Rick Husband, American colonel, pilot, and astronaut (d. 2003)
  1957   – Dave Semenko, Canadian ice hockey player and sportscaster (d. 2017)
1958 – J. D. Hayworth, American politician and radio host 
  1958   – Tonya Lee Williams, English-Canadian actress and producer
1959 – David Brown, Australian meteorologist
  1959   – Tupou VI, King of Tonga
  1959   – Karl J. Friston, English psychiatrist and neuroscientist
  1959   – Charlie Murphy, American actor and comedian (d. 2017)
1961 – Heikko Glöde, German footballer and manager
  1961   – Shiva Rajkumar, Indian actor, singer, and producer
1962 – Julio César Chávez, Mexican boxer
  1962   – Luc De Vos, Belgian singer-songwriter and guitarist (d. 2014)
  1962   – Joanna Shields, American-English businesswoman
  1962   – Dean Wilkins, English footballer and manager
1964 – Gaby Roslin, English television host and actress
1965 – Sanjay Manjrekar, Indian cricketer and sportscaster
  1965   – Robin Wilson, American singer and guitarist 
1966 – Jeff Bucknum, American race car driver
  1966   – Annabel Croft, English tennis player and sportscaster
  1966   – Taiji, Japanese bass player and songwriter (d. 2011)
1967 – Richard Herring, English comedian and screenwriter
  1967   – Mac McCaughan, American singer and guitarist 
  1967   – John Petrucci, American singer-songwriter and guitarist 
  1967   – Bruny Surin, Canadian sprinter
1968 – Catherine Plewinski, French swimmer
1969 – Lisa Nicole Carson, American actress 
  1969   – Chantal Jouanno, French politician, French Minister of Youth Affairs and Sports
  1969   – Alan Mullally, English cricketer and sportscaster
  1969   – Anne-Sophie Pic, French chef
  1969   – Jesse Pintado, Mexican-American guitarist (d. 2006)
1970 – Aure Atika, Portuguese-French actress, director, and screenwriter
  1970   – Lee Byung-hun, South Korean actor, singer, and dancer
1971 – Joel Casamayor, Cuban-American former professional boxer
  1971   – Andriy Kovalenco, Ukrainian-Spanish rugby player
  1971   – Loni Love, American comedian, actress, and talk show host
  1971   – Kristi Yamaguchi, American figure skater
1972 – Travis Best, American basketball player
  1972   – Jake Wood, English actor
1973 – Christian Vieri, Italian footballer
1974 – Sharon den Adel, Dutch singer-songwriter 
  1974   – Stelios Giannakopoulos, Greek footballer and manager
  1974   – Gregory Shane Helms, American professional wrestler
1975 – Phil Lord, American filmmaker
  1975 – Carolina Kasting, Brazilian actress
1976 – Dan Boyle, Canadian ice hockey player
  1976   – Anna Friel, English actress
  1976   – Tracie Spencer, American singer-songwriter and actress
1977 – Neil Harris, English footballer and manager
  1977   – Steve Howey, American actor
  1977   – Brock Lesnar, American mixed martial artist and wrestler
  1977   – Francesca Lubiani, Italian tennis player
  1977   – Marco Silva, Portuguese football manager
1978 – Topher Grace, American actor
  1978   – Michelle Rodriguez, American actress
1979 – Brooke Baldwin, American journalist and television news anchor
  1979   – Nikos Barlos, Greek basketball player
  1979   – Maya Kobayashi, Japanese journalist
1980 – Kristen Connolly, American actress 
1981 – Adrienne Camp, South African singer-songwriter
  1981   – Pradeepan Raveendran, Sri Lankan director, producer, and screenwriter
1982 – Antonio Cassano, Italian footballer
  1982   – Jason Wright, American football player, businessman, and executive
1984 – Gareth Gates, English singer-songwriter  
  1984   – Jonathan Lewis, American football player
  1984   – Natalie Martinez, American actress 
  1984   – Michael McGovern, Irish footballer
  1984   – Sami Zayn, Canadian professional wrestler
1985 – Paulo Vitor Barreto, Brazilian footballer
  1985   – Gianluca Curci, Italian footballer
  1985   – Keven Lacombe, Canadian cyclist
  1985   – Ismael Londt, Surinamese-Dutch kickboxer
1986 – 360, Australian rapper 
  1986   – Didier Digard, French footballer
  1986   – Hannaliis Jaadla, Estonian footballer
  1986   – JP Pietersen, South African rugby player
  1986   – Simone Laudehr, German footballer
1988 – LeSean McCoy, American football player
  1988   – Inbee Park, South Korean golfer
1989 – Nick Palmieri, American ice hockey player
1990 – Bebé, Portuguese footballer
  1990   – Rachel Brosnahan, American actress
1991 – Salih Dursun, Turkish footballer
  1991   – James Rodríguez, Colombian footballer
1992 – Bartosz Bereszyński, Polish footballer
1993 – Kurt Capewell, Australian rugby league player
1994 – Kanako Momota, Japanese singer-songwriter 
1995 – Evania Pelite, Australian rugby union player
  1995   – Luke Shaw, English footballer
  1995   – Jordyn Wieber, American gymnast
1996 – Moussa Dembélé, French footballer
  1996   – Jordan Romero, American mountaineer
1997 – Malala Yousafzai, Pakistani-English activist, Nobel Prize laureate
2000 – Vinícius Júnior, Brazilian footballer

Deaths

Pre-1600
 524 – Viventiolus, archbishop of Lyon (b. 460)
 783 – Bertrada of Laon, Frankish queen (b. 720)
 965 – Meng Chang, emperor of Later Shu (b. 919)
 981 – Xue Juzheng, Chinese scholar-official and historian
1067 – John Komnenos, Byzantine general
1441 – Ashikaga Yoshinori, Japanese shōgun (b. 1394)
  1441   – Kyōgoku Takakazu, Japanese nobleman
1489 – Bahlul Lodi, sultan of Delhi
1536 – Desiderius Erasmus, Dutch priest and philosopher (b. 1466)
1584 – Steven Borough, English navigator and explorer (b. 1525)

1601–1900
1623 – William Bourchier, 3rd Earl of Bath (b. 1557)
1664 – Stefano della Bella, Italian illustrator and engraver (b. 1610)
1682 – Jean Picard, French priest and astronomer (b. 1620)
1691 – Marquis de St Ruth, French general
1693 – John Ashby, English admiral (b. 1640)
1712 – Richard Cromwell, English academic and politician (b. 1626)
1742 – Evaristo Felice Dall'Abaco, Italian violinist and composer (b. 1675)
1749 – Charles de la Boische, Marquis de Beauharnois, French navy officer and politician, Governor General of New France (b. 1671)
1773 – Johann Joachim Quantz, German flute player and composer (b. 1697)
1804 – Alexander Hamilton, American general, economist, and politician, 1st United States Secretary of the Treasury (b. 1755)
1845 – Henrik Wergeland, Norwegian linguist, poet, and playwright (b. 1808)
1850 – Robert Stevenson, Scottish engineer (b. 1772)
1855 – Pavel Nakhimov, Russian admiral (b. 1802)
1870 – John A. Dahlgren, American admiral (b. 1809)
1892 – Alexander Cartwright, American firefighter, invented baseball (b. 1820)

1901–present
 1908 – William D. Coleman, 13th President of Liberia (b. 1842)
1910 – Charles Rolls, English engineer and businessman, co-founded Rolls-Royce Limited (b. 1877)
1926 – Gertrude Bell, English archaeologist and spy (b. 1868)
  1926   – Charles Wood Irish composer (b. 1866)
1929 – Robert Henri, American painter and educator (b. 1865)
1931 – Nathan Söderblom, Swedish archbishop, Nobel Prize laureate (b. 1866)
1934 – Ole Evinrude, Norwegian-American inventor and businessman, invented the outboard motor (b. 1877)
1935 – Alfred Dreyfus, French colonel (b. 1859)
1944 – Theodore Roosevelt, Jr., American general and politician, Governor of Puerto Rico (b. 1887)
1945 – Boris Galerkin, Russian mathematician and engineer (b. 1871)
  1945   – Wolfram Freiherr von Richthofen, German field marshal (b. 1895)
1946 – Ray Stannard Baker, American journalist and author (b. 1870)
1947 – Jimmie Lunceford, American saxophonist and bandleader (b. 1902)
1949 – Douglas Hyde, Irish scholar and politician, 1st President of Ireland (b. 1860)
1950 – Elsie de Wolfe, American actress, author, and interior decorator (b. 1865)
1956 – John Hayes, Australian politician, 25th Premier of Tasmania (b. 1868)
1961 – Mazo de la Roche, Canadian author and playwright (b. 1879)
1962 – Roger Wolfe Kahn, American composer and bandleader (b. 1907)
1965 – Christfried Burmeister, Estonian speed skater (b. 1898)
1966 – D. T. Suzuki, Japanese philosopher and author (b. 1870)
1969 – Henry George Lamond, Australian farmer and author (b. 1885)
1971 – Yvon Robert, Canadian wrestler (b. 1914)
1973 – Lon Chaney, Jr., American actor (b. 1906)
1975 – James Ormsbee Chapin, American painter and illustrator (b. 1887)
1979 – Olive Morris, Jamaican-English civil rights activist (b. 1952)
  1979   – Minnie Riperton, American singer-songwriter (b. 1947)
1980 – John Warren Davis, American educator, college administrator, and civil rights leader (b. 1888)
1982 – Kenneth More, English actor (b. 1914)
1983 – Chris Wood, English saxophonist (b. 1944)
1990 – João Saldanha, Brazilian footballer, manager, and journalist (b. 1917)
1992 – Caroline Pafford Miller, American journalist and author (b. 1903)
1993 – Dan Eldon, English photographer and journalist (b. 1970)
1994 – Eila Campbell, English geographer and cartographer (b. 1915)
1996 – John Chancellor, American journalist (b. 1927)
1997 – François Furet, French historian and author (b. 1927)
1998 – Jimmy Driftwood, American singer-songwriter and banjo player (b. 1907)
  1998   – Arkady Ostashev, Soviet/Russian scientist and engineer (b. 1925)
  1998   – Serge Lemoyne, Canadian painter (b. 1941)
1999 – Rajendra Kumar, Indian actor (b. 1921)
2000 – Charles Merritt, Canadian colonel and politician, Victoria Cross recipient (b. 1908)
2001 – Fred Marcellino, American author and illustrator (b. 1939)
2003 – Benny Carter, American trumpet player, saxophonist, and composer (b. 1907)
  2003   – Mark Lovell, English race car driver (b. 1960)
2004 – Betty Oliphant, English-Canadian ballerina, co-founded the National Ballet School of Canada (b. 1918)
2005 – John King, Baron King of Wartnaby, English businessman (b. 1917)
2007 – Robert Burås, Norwegian singer-songwriter and guitarist (b. 1975)
  2007   – Stan Zemanek, Australian radio and television host (b. 1947)
2008 – Bobby Murcer, American baseball player, coach, and sportscaster (b. 1946)
  2008   – Tony Snow, American journalist, 26th White House Press Secretary (b. 1955)
2010 – Olga Guillot, Cuban-American singer (b. 1922)
  2010   – James P. Hogan, English-American author (b. 1941)
  2010   – Paulo Moura, Brazilian clarinetist and saxophonist (b. 1932)
  2010   – Pius Njawé, Cameroonian journalist (b. 1957)
  2010   – Harvey Pekar, American author and critic (b. 1939)
2011 – Sherwood Schwartz, American screenwriter and producer (b. 1916)
2012 – Alimuddin, Pakistani cricketer (b. 1930)
  2012   – Dara Singh, Indian wrestler, actor, and politician (b. 1928)
  2012   – Eddy Brown, English footballer and manager (b. 1926)
  2012   – Else Holmelund Minarik, Danish-American author and illustrator (b. 1920)
  2012   – Roger Payne, English mountaineer (b. 1956)
  2012   – Hamid Samandarian, Iranian director and playwright (b. 1931)
  2012   – George C. Stoney, American director and producer (b. 1916)
2013 – Amar Bose, American businessman, founded the Bose Corporation (b. 1929)
  2013   – Takako Takahashi, Japanese author (b. 1932)
  2013   – Elaine Morgan, Welsh writer (b. 1920)
  2013   – Alan Whicker, Egyptian-English journalist (b. 1925)
2014 – Jamil Ahmad, Pakistani author (b. 1931)
  2014   – Nestor Basterretxea, Spanish painter and sculptor (b. 1924)
  2014   – Emil Bobu, Romanian politician (b. 1927)
  2014   – Alfred de Grazia, American political scientist and author (b. 1919)
  2014   – Kenneth J. Gray, American soldier and politician (b. 1924)
  2014   – Valeriya Novodvorskaya, Russian journalist and politician (b. 1950)
2015 – D'Army Bailey, American lawyer, judge, and actor (b. 1941)
  2015   – Chenjerai Hove, Zimbabwean journalist, author, and poet (b. 1956)
  2015   – Tenzin Delek Rinpoche, Tibetan monk and activist (b. 1950)
  2015   – Cheng Siwei, Chinese engineer, economist, and politician (b. 1935)
2016 – Goran Hadžić, Serbian politician (b. 1958)
2019 – Emily Hartridge, English Youtuber and television presenter (b. 1984)
2020 – Kelly Preston, American actress and model (b. 1962)
  2020   – Wim Suurbier, a Dutch football player, (b. 1945)

Holidays and observances
Birthday of the Heir to the Crown of Tonga (Tonga)
Christian feast day:
Feast of Saints Peter and Paul (Eastern Orthodox)
Hermagoras and Fortunatus
Jason of Thessalonica (Catholic Church)
John Gualbert
Louis Martin and Marie-Azélie Guérin
Nabor and Felix
Nathan Söderblom (Lutheran, Episcopal Church (USA))
Veronica
Viventiolus
July 12 (Eastern Orthodox liturgics)
Independence Day, celebrates the independence of Kiribati from the United Kingdom in 1979.
Independence Day, celebrates the independence of São Tomé and Príncipe from Portugal in 1975.
The second day of Naadam (Mongolia)
The Twelfth, also known as Orangemen's Day (Northern Ireland, Scotland, Newfoundland and Labrador)

References

External links

 
 
 

Days of the year
July